Seerat Kapoor is an Indian actress, model, choreographer and dancer who predominantly works in the Telugu cinema. She began her career as an Assistant Choreographer. She made acting debut in 2014 Telugu film Run Raja Run.

Early life
Kapoor was born on 3 April 1993 in Mumbai, India. Her father, the late Vineet Kapoor was a hotelier and her mother, Neena Sihota Kapoor, is an air hostess with Air India. Kapoor was educated at Mumbai's Podar International School, Santa Cruz and completed her pre-university course at R. D. National College, Bandra. She subsequently enrolled for a Bachelor Of Arts degree in Mass communication, but quit it due to scheduling conflicts with her acting.

At the time, she was at the peak of her dance career, which she began at age 16 for Bollywood choreographer; Ashley Lobo, The Danceworx, Mumbai. Kapoor was a full-time dance instructor at the academy. In the course of her journey, Kapoor worked on Rockstar and was brought on board as Assistant Choreographer.

Intrigued by modelling, she trained as an actor at her cousin's grandfather's institution, Roshan Tanejaa School Of Acting. In 2014, Kapoor debuted in Run Raja Run.

Career
In 2011 Kapoor have worked as assistant choreographer in Rockstar film. she announced in 2014 that she would appear in Run Raja Run opposite Sharwanand, directed by Sujeeth. Run Raja Run was a commercial success.

In 2015 Madhu B. and N.V. Prasad signed her to play Ganga in the action film Tiger. Set against the backdrop of Varanasi, the film also starred Sundeep Kishan and Rahul Ravindran. Her next release (2015) came alongside Sumanth Ashwin in the R. Shamala directed romantic comedy, Columbus, produced by Ashwani Kumar Sahdev. Kapoor's performance was applauded as the highlight of the film in the role of Neeraja.

In October 2017, she completed filming Raju Gari Gadhi 2 opposite Nagarjuna and was filming Touch Chesi Chudu opposite Ravi Teja and Allu Sirish's Okka Kshanam. Her latest release was on Netflix titled Krishna and His Leela (2020)

Kapoor endorsed several brands and products, including Vivel, Engage Cologne Sprays, Apollo Tyres for Dibakar Banerjee, Mahindra gusto and Intex with Farhan Akhtar.

Other work 
In addition to acting and dancing, Kapoor is a trained Indian Classical singer from Rajesree School Of Music from age 12.

Filmography

Music videos

References

External links
 

Living people
21st-century Indian actresses
Year of birth missing (living people)
Indian film actresses
Actresses in Hindi cinema
Actresses in Telugu cinema
Female models from Mumbai
Indian dance teachers
Actresses from Mumbai